Xixerella is an urbanization of around 20 houses in the La Massana parish of the principality of Andorra.

Populated places in Andorra
La Massana